Aragami may also refer to:
 Aragami (film), a 2003 film
 Aragami (video game), a 2016 video game